The Fender Jaguar Baritone Custom or Jaguar Bass VI Custom is a retro six-string electric bass guitar manufactured in 2005 and 2006. It is based on the 1964 Fender Jaguar electric guitar and the 1961 six-string Fender Bass VI electric bass guitar.

The tuning for The Baritone Custom is set one octave lower than a standard tuned guitar. It uses the same bass string set as the Bass VI model, but with a shorter scale length giving the Baritone Custom less string tension.

The body shape, pickup, and its switching setup are identical to the two pickup Jaguar model. Its electrics (not pickups or body shape) are similar to the four-string Jaguar Bass, which was issued in 2006 and is still in production today.

It has a fixed bridge rather than the Fender floating tremolo used on the Bass VI and all other Jaguar models. Only the Baritone Custom, its variant, and models of the Fender Jaguar Special HH lack a floating tremolo.

They all have separate and similar belly-mounted bridges and tailpieces. 

The Jaguar Baritone Custom is a Crafted-In-Japan model. The difference is the master has different switches and an unusual internal wiring. It includes a fuzz switch.

In 2006, Fender USA changed the name of the instrument to Jaguar Bass VI Custom. The term baritone guitar refers to one tuned B to B, between the tunings of a standard guitar and a bass. Despite the Bass VI called a baritone for most of its production run, The Jaguar Baritone Custom was always designed as a bass.

At the end of 2006, Fender decided to discontinue the model entirely. There have been no intentions to start manufacturing it again.

Literature
 

Fender electric guitars
Fender electric bass guitars